Boyacá  is the name of a region in Colombia.  It may refer to other connections to Colombia:

 Battle of Boyacá
 Boyacá Department (Gran Colombia)
 Boyacá Department
 Boyacá, Boyacá, a municipality
 Boyacá State, a former state
 Puerto Boyacá, a town and municipality in the Boyacá Department

In Bogotá
 Boyacá (TransMilenio), a bus station
 Puente de Boyacá, a bridge

In Tunja
 Boyacá Chicó F.C.